

Men's competition

– 56 kg

– 60 kg

– 67.5 kg

– 75 kg

– 82.5 kg

– 90 kg

+ 90 kg

Medal table 

 
1963
1963 Pan American Games
Pan American Games